Ben Parker may refer to:

Uncle Ben, Ben Parker, a fictional character who is the uncle of Peter Parker / Spider-Man
Benjamin Richard Parker, son of Peter Parker and little brother of Spider-Girl in the Marvel Comics 2 continuity
Ben Parker (footballer) (born 1987), English football player
Ben L. Parker (1913–2003), member of the Pennsylvania House of Representatives
Ben Parker, English singer-songwriter, member of Ben & Jason